James Terence Smith (20 June 1902 – 1975) was a Scottish footballer who played for Liverpool from 1929 to 1931.

Smith scored 66 goals in 38 appearances in the 1927–28 Scottish Division Two season with Ayr United, a British record to date.

He was Liverpool's top scorer during the 1929–30 season, scoring 23 goals in all competitions. His move into Non-League football next season was a big shock to the football world but season 1932–33 was spent in the Southern League with Tunbridge Wells Rangers. The following season, he went to Bristol Rovers then Newport County followed by Notts County then he completed the circle in 1937 by returning to Scotland with Dumbarton.

References

External links
Profile at LFCHistory.net

1902 births
1975 deaths
Scottish footballers
Sportspeople from Clydebank
Footballers from West Dunbartonshire
Scottish emigrants to the United States
Association football forwards
Dumbarton Harp F.C. players
Clydebank F.C. (1914) players
Rangers F.C. players
Ayr United F.C. players
Liverpool F.C. players
Bristol Rovers F.C. players
Newport County A.F.C. players
Notts County F.C. players
Dumbarton F.C. players
Dumbarton F.C. managers
Scottish football managers
Tunbridge Wells F.C. players
Scottish Football League managers
Scottish Junior Football Association players
Scottish Football League players
English Football League players
Southern Football League players